Wieland Schmidt (born 23 December 1953 in Magdeburg-Ottersleben) is a former East German handball player who competed in the 1980 Summer Olympics and in the 1988 Summer Olympics.

He was a member of the East German handball team which won the gold medal. He played all six matches as goalkeeper.

Eight years later he was part of the East German team which finished seventh. He played all six matches as goalkeeper again.

External links
profile

1953 births
Living people
Sportspeople from Magdeburg
German male handball players
Handball players at the 1980 Summer Olympics
Handball players at the 1988 Summer Olympics
Olympic handball players of East Germany
Olympic gold medalists for East Germany
Olympic medalists in handball
Medalists at the 1980 Summer Olympics